Inge Mundt is a retired East German rower who won a gold and a silver medal in the eight event at the 1966 and 1967 European Rowing Championships.

References

Year of birth missing (living people)
Living people
East German female rowers
European Rowing Championships medalists